Christos Tsekos (born April 4, 1966 in Athens, Greece) is a retired Greek professional basketball player. He played professionally in the Greek Basket League, and he represented Greece at the senior level.

Professional career
Tsekos played with Panellinios, Iraklis, and PAOK. While playing with PAOK, Tsekos, won the FIBA Korać Cup in 1994, and the Greek Cup in 1995. He was also a FIBA European Cup Winners' Cup finalist in 1996, and a EuroLeague semifinalist in 1993.

National team career
Tsekos played at the 1993 EuroBasket, and he was a member of the senior men's Greek national team that finished in 4th place at the 1994 FIBA World Championship. He played in 54 games with Greece's senior national team, scoring a total of 78 points.

References

External links
FIBA Archive Profile
FIBA Europe Profile
Hellenic Federation Profile 

1966 births
Greek men's basketball players
Greek Basket League players
Living people
Iraklis Thessaloniki B.C. players
P.A.O.K. BC players
Panellinios B.C. players
Basketball players from Athens
Centers (basketball)
1994 FIBA World Championship players